Rozbórz Okrągły  (Rozbir Okruhlyi) is a village in the administrative district of Gmina Pruchnik, within Jarosław County, Subcarpathian Voivodeship, in south-eastern Poland.

References

Villages in Jarosław County